Stephen Leece (born November 4, 1991) is an American former professional racing cyclist, who rode professionally for  between 2014 and 2016. In 2014, Leece finished second at the Bucks County Classic, 53 seconds behind winner Zachary Bell. He rode in the men's team time trial at the 2015 UCI Road World Championships.

References

External links
 

1991 births
Living people
American male cyclists
People from San Luis Obispo, California
Cyclists from California